Hugh Campbell McLaren (8 June 1926 – 9 May 1992) was a New Zealand rugby union international player, who played in one test match in 1952.

References

1926 births
1992 deaths
New Zealand rugby union players
New Zealand international rugby union players